"My First Taste of Texas" is a song co-written and recorded by American country music artist Ed Bruce.  It was released in January 1983 as the second single from his album I Write It Down.  The song reached number 6 on the Billboard Hot Country Singles chart.  Bruce wrote the song with Ronnie Rogers.

Chart performance

References

Songs about Texas
1983 singles
Ed Bruce songs
Songs written by Ed Bruce
Songs written by Ronnie Rogers
Tommy West
MCA Records singles
1983 songs